The V-cableway is a planned gondola cableway with a shared base station at Grindelwald with one route to  Männlichen and the other to Eigergletscher railway station. It is being built by Jungfraubahn AG.

Project
The project has two aims. Firstly it will replace the Grindelwald–Männlichen gondola cableway which dates from 1978 with a larger capacity gondola service and reduce journey times to Männlichen by 12 minutes. Secondly it will reduce travelling times for visitors to the Jungfraujoch by providing a direct connection, known as the Eiger Express, from a new station on the Berner Oberland Bahn at Rothenegg to Eigergletscher railway station.

Construction started in the summer of 2018 and the CHF 400m project was completed in 2020.

Completed projects
 Grindelwald Terminal new station
 Eiger Express
 Männlichen
 Eigergletscher Station expansion

References

Cable cars in Switzerland
Bernese Oberland
Gondola lifts
Grindelwald
Transport in the canton of Bern
Proposed transport infrastructure in Switzerland